Jalaibee (meaning twist) is a 2015 Pakistani caper action thriller film directed and written by Yasir Jaswal, produced by Eman Syed. Jalaibee is a joint production of ARY Films & Redrum Films in association with Sermad Films and Jaswal Films. The film stars prominent TV actors Danish Taimoor and Ali Safina in lead roles along with Adnan Jaffar, Sajid Hasan, Uzair Jaswal, Wiqar Ali Khan, Sabeeka Imam and Zhalay Sarhadi.

It is the first Pakistani film to be shot with Arri Alexa camera. The film is shot in capital cities Islamabad, Lahore and Karachi. Jalaibee features Ford Mustang 73 in the film as well as its mascot. It is about the intertwined stories of numerous relatable characters who are all struggling with their problems, and who somehow connect on a unifying level.

Plot 

Jalaibee's story revolves around two orphaned friends Billu (Danish Taimoor) and Bugga (Ali Safina) who get tangled up in a debt with the local mafia called The Unit. As they look for ways to pay the debt before The Unit comes to collect, they find out they are in deeper waters than they thought. Thinking of different ways to pay the debt, they stumble upon an idea to rob a local casino. To execute this heist, they enlist the help of a bar dancer named Banno (Zhalay Sarhadi) to seduce to the owner of the casino.

At the same time, another man Ali (Wiqar Ali Khan), along with his brother and partner, Jimmy (Uzair Jaswal), wants revenge against The King, a mafia don who killed his father and forced his mother to commit suicide when he was young. The King's front man Dara (Adnan Jaffar) is caught between collecting the debt and handling the kidnapping while retaining fear and control over the city.

Simultaneously, Eman (Sabeeka Imam), the daughter of wealthy industrialist and contender for the Prime Minister's seat, Akbar Chaudhary (Sajid Hassan), is trying to talk to her father about Ali, her beau. This proves to be difficult with the election coming closer by the day.

Cast 
 Danish Taimoor as Billu
 Ali Safina as Bugga
 Wiqar Ali Khan as Ali
 Zhalay Sarhadi as Bunno
 Sajid Hasan as Akbar
 Sabeeka Imam as Eman
 Adnan Jaffar as Dara
 Uzair Jaswal as Jimmy
 Salman Shaukat as Imran

Production

Casting 
In interview with The National, director said: "The casting was done with my casting director Ehtesham Ansari, who has also styled everyone in the film. There were a couple of people I had in mind when I was writing every character. Some of them didn’t work out, some did. One who did work out was Ali Safeena, who plays Bugga. He is the narrator of the story and I could always see him as Bugga. I knew from the start that I didn’t want any big names in my film. It’s not to take anything away from them, but I wanted to broaden the horizon a bit. We have a lot of talented actors and actresses who never get a chance to appear on the big screen because not that many films are being made."

Filming 
Jalaibee is produced by Eman Bente Syed of Sermad Films and executive producer of film is Murtaza Shah of Redrum Films. Shooting started from summer 2013 in Islamabad and it took to Karachi after finishing Lahore shoot. Film production designers Khurram Syed and Nida Khan designed set worth Rs. 2 million for Jalaibee in Ever New Studios, Lahore where film's last few scenes and a song was filmed. Aqeel ur Rehman of Set & Act designed sets for Jalaibee shot in Eastern Studios, Karachi. Film shooting session ended in September 2014. The film was shot by Arri Alexa by which blockbuster films like Gravity, Skyfall and Ironman 3 were shot. Jalaibee is part animated film, edited by Rizwan AQ, artwork of which is illustrated by Babrus Khan in Lahore. VFX of the film is done by London based Sharp Image.

Marketing 
On 2 December 2013 first look poster was unveiled featuring Ford Mustang 73 and announcing teaser's release date. The teaser trailer of the film was released on 25 December 2013 on ARY Digital Network, film's official Facebook page and on vimeo by Jaswal Films simultaneously. The teaser was also played on big screen at 1st ARY Film Awards where Jalaibee team including Wiqar Ali Khan, Ali Safina, Uzair Jaswal, Sabeeka Imam, Zhalay Sarhadi, and Asal Din Khan given the introduction of film. On 16 October 2014 second title poster was released on Danish Taimoor's Facebook page and later on film's page. On 23 January 2015 final poster was revealed along with film's release date followed by character posters in the same week. On Januar 31, 2015 theatrical trailer was unveiled on official Facebook and on channels run by ARY Digital Network. In February, Malik Riaz of Bahria Town joined ARY Films to revive Pakistani cinema by announcing a reward for those, coming to watch Jalaibee. Founder and CEO of ARY Digital Salman Iqbal revealed that Malik Riaz has purchased 10,000 tickets of Jalaibee for residents of Bahria Town giving film a kick start of Rs 5 million before it release.

Music 

The soundtrack features 9 tracks by various artists including Qayaas, Uzair Jaswal and Humaira Arshad, only one of them is performed in film while others are used as a background score which was composed by Abbas Ali Khan. Song Jee Raha written & composed by Umair Jaswal and Sarmad Ghafoor was released on 18 March 2015 whereas film's soundtrack album was released on 26 March by EMI Pakistan.

Release 
On 26 December 2013 an agreement was signed between Redrum Films and ARY Films for film distribution. As per distributor ARY Films, film was announced to release in summer season 2014, but for a reason it was postponed for 2015 release. Explaining the reason for the delay, director said "The production team had run out of funds and the reason behind releasing the teaser was strategic. Wanting to get financers on board, we worked on the pre-production of the film quite extensively, which resulted in delay of the film’s release." On 23 January 2015 ARY Films announced to release the film on 20 March 2015 across Pakistan, U.K and U.S.A simultaneously.

Reception

Box office
The film collected  before its release and became first of Pakistani films to do so because property person Malik Riaz bought 10,000 tickets for the Bahria Town residents to watch Jalaibee in cinemas. Movie had good number of public previews on Thursday and came out well on them collecting  which is biggest preview collections ever in Pakistan. Movie opened very well on Friday with day one being 7th biggest ever and 2nd biggest for Pakistani movies as movie collected . Movie grew around 10% on Day two collecting  with best growth in Karachi and Islamabad. Film had national Holiday on Monday but movie couldn't sustain as figures went down to  taking 4 Day Extended Weekend to .Film fell further on Tuesday as it was first non-Holiday Weekday of film. Film had low yet steady Weekdays taking Week One total to .Film held best in Karachi over Weekdays.

Critical response
Saba Khalid of DAWN.com reviewed the film and wrote, "Hopefully, we’ve also graduated to a time that reviews of Pakistani movies will no longer be meant to just stroke director’s egos but really analyze and critique the originality and creativity of scripts, themes, characters, and judge the overall level of acting and direction displayed in the film." Rafay Mahmood of The Express Tribune rated movie 2/5 stars and given the verdict, "All in all Jalaibee has its moments but it is definitely not entertaining. It does pick up a little in the second-half but what kills it towards the end is a dragged moral debate for a film that purely stands on immoral choices and of ourse{sic} a very Na Maloom Afraad climax." Aayan Mirza and Momin Ali Munshi of Galaxy Lollywood rated 2.5/5 stars and wrote, "Jalaibee is sweet, but at certain bites it goes pretty bland. You watch it for its amazing cinematography, style, and a promising soundtrack. You don’t expect from it an acting treat and don’t go looking for a thrill. There are loops within loops, and some more of those promised twists with them, that you have to give to the writer. But then there are some loopholes as well, but on the whole this film is worth a watch."

Accolades

See also
 List of highest-grossing Pakistani films
 List of Pakistani films of 2015

References

External links 
 
 
 

Pakistani action thriller films
Films shot in Lahore
Films shot in Islamabad
Films shot in Karachi
2015 films
2010s crime thriller films
Pakistani crime action films